Oskar Slaaen (13 September 1907 – 3 March 1972) was a Norwegian politician for the Liberal Party.

He served as a deputy representative to the Norwegian Parliament from Telemark during the term 1965–1969.

References

1907 births
1972 deaths
Deputy members of the Storting
Liberal Party (Norway) politicians